This is a list of active and extinct volcanoes in El Salvador.

Volcanoes

See also

 Central America Volcanic Arc
 List of volcanoes in Guatemala
 List of volcanoes in Honduras
 List of volcanoes in Nicaragua

References 

El Salvador
 
Volcanoes